Rodenbourg is a village in the commune of Junglinster, in central Luxembourg.  , the village has a population of 159 inhabitants.

Rodenbourg gave its name to a commune in the canton of Grevenmacher until 1 January 1979, when it was merged into the commune of Junglinster.  The law merging Rodenbourg into Junglinster was passed on 23 December 1978.

Former commune
The former commune consisted of the villages:

 Beidweiler
 Eschweiler
 Gonderange
 Rodenbourg

References

Junglinster
Villages in Luxembourg
Former communes of Luxembourg